These are the Billboard Hot 100 number one hits of 1962.

That year, 14 acts achieved their first number one songs, namely Joey Dee and the Starliters, Gene Chandler, Bruce Channel, Shelley Fabares, Mr. Acker Bilk, David Rose, Bobby Vinton, Neil Sedaka, Little Eva, Tommy Roe, The Four Seasons, Bobby "Boris" Pickett, The Crystals, and The Tornados. The Four Seasons were the only act to have more than one song hit number one that year.

NOTE: Billboard changed its issue dates from a Monday back to a Saturday schedule on January 6, thus fixing the previous one-week inconsistency. The issue dates were originally changed from a Saturday to a Monday schedule on April 29, 1957.

Chart history

Number-one artists

See also
1962 in music
List of Billboard number-one singles

References

Sources
Fred Bronson's Billboard Book of Number 1 Hits, 5th Edition
Joel Whitburn's Top Pop Singles 1955-2008, 12 Edition
Joel Whitburn Presents the Billboard Hot 100 Charts: The Sixties
Additional information obtained can be verified within Billboard's online archive services and print editions of the magazine.

1962 record charts
1962